The electoral district of East Devon, sometimes referred to as Devon East, was an electoral district of the Tasmanian House of Assembly. It was based on Tasmania's north coast in the town of Devonport and the surrounding rural area.

The seat was created as a single-member seat ahead of the 1871 election following the abolition of the Devon seat. In 1886, it became a two-member seat, and at the 1897 election, it was abolished and split into the electorates of Devonport and Latrobe.

Members for East Devon

References
 
 
 Parliament of Tasmania (2006). The Parliament of Tasmania from 1956

Former electoral districts of Tasmania
1871 establishments in Australia
1897 disestablishments in Australia